The 1978 Montreal municipal election took place on November 12, 1978, to elect a mayor and city councillors in Montreal, Quebec, Canada. Longtime mayor Jean Drapeau was re-elected to another four-year term in office, defeating Canadian federal parliamentarian Serge Joyal.

Elections were also held in Montreal's suburban communities in November 1978. Most suburban elections took place on November 5; the election in Saint-Léonard was held on November 12.

Results
Mayor

Council

Party colours do not indicate affiliation or resemblance to a provincial or a federal party.

Results in suburban communities

Dorval

Source: Rodolphe Morissette, "Quatre nouveaux maires sur l'île de Montréal," Le Devoir, November 6, 1978, pp. 1-3.

Montréal-Nord

Source: "Les élections municipales," Le Devoir, 6 November 1978, A3.

Saint-Léonard

Information on elected candidates in suburban communities
Parti de l'alliance municipale
Robert Benoît (Ward Three) was elected in a close contest over five opponents. He did not seek re-election in 1982.

Elections in other Montreal-area communities

Longueuil
The 1978 municipal election in Longueuil did not produce a clear winner. Marcel Robidas of the Parti civique de Longueuil was re-elected as mayor, but nine of the seventeen council seats were won by the opposition Parti municipal de Longueuil.

Winning candidates appear in boldface.

Post-election changes:
Paul-Auguste Briand was subsequently expelled from the Parti municipal for breaking with the party on a vote pertaining to the Place Longueuil. This deprived by Parti municipal of its working majority on council.

Source: Le Parti municipal de Longueuil: Les origines du Parti municipal , Société historique et culturelle du Marigot, accessed January 10, 2014.

References

1978 Quebec municipal elections
Municipal elections in Montreal
1970s in Montreal
1978 in Quebec